The Satara District is under proposal to be divided and a separate Satara District be carved out of existing Satara district with the inclusion of Karad and Patan as well as talukas of Walwa, Kadegaon and Shirala from neighboring Sangli district in the proposed Karad district. Due to expenses related new district.the plan of Karad district is permanently shelved

Satara district
Proposed districts in Maharashtra
Pune division
Karad